Grand Brewing Luxembourg,  is a Luxembourgish brewery founded by Mark Hatherly in 2014.

History
Grand Brewing was founded in 2014 by Mark Heatherly. In 2015, the company launched its first commercial release : the Red Bridge Amber Ale (named after the Grand Duchess Charlotte Bridge). Since then it has also released Luxembourgs first ever India Pale Ale, named Satellite I.P.A. (named after Luxembourg's famous SES Astra company). The release of a Pilsner and Porter beer are planned sometime in the near future.

Before 2016, Grand Brewing was known as Capital City Brewing, but since there was already a company holding the rights to this name, they changed to the now known Grand Brewing Luxembourg.

See also
 Beer in Luxembourg
 Brasserie Nationale
 Brasserie de Luxembourg

References

External links
 Official website

Breweries in Luxembourg
Food and drink companies established in 2014
Luxembourgian companies established in 2014